SPQR: A History of Ancient Rome is a 2015 book by English classicist Mary Beard that was published in the United Kingdom by Profile Books and elsewhere by Liveright & Company.

SPQR appeared on the hardcover, non-fiction bestseller list in December 2015.

It was a finalist for the 2015 National Book Critics Circle Award (Nonfiction).

References

History books about ancient Rome
2015 non-fiction books
Boni & Liveright books
Profile Books books